Karl-Heinz Werner Toosbuy (23 February 1928 – 8 June 2004) was a Danish businessman, the founder and owner of ECCO, the Danish shoe company.

Karl Toosbuy trained as a shoemaker and by his early 30s, was running a Copenhagen factory. In 1963, he moved with his wife Birte and daughter Hanni to Bredebro on the west coast of Denmark, just north of the German border. Toosbuy started ECCO in what had been an empty factory.

He died on 8 June 2004.

References

1928 births
2004 deaths
Danish billionaires
20th-century Danish businesspeople
21st-century Danish businesspeople